Franco Borruto is an Italian professor, author and gynecologist resident since many years in Monte Carlo, Principality of Monaco.

Career
In May 2002, he was appointed Professor of Gynecology and Obstetrics in the University of Verona. Until September 2010 he worked in Verona, Head of the Unit of Pathology and Gynecologic Endocrinology for Adolescents. Currently he is member of the “Ordre des Medecins” of Monaco and he exercised for five years (September 2010-October 2015) his activities at the Gynecology Service of the Princess Grace Hospital Centre (CHPG).

He is the author of more than 300 publications and 8 monographs. He is the Editor of the book “HPV and Cervical cancer” (Springer, NY). He practiced more than 3600 surgical operations. He is Honorary Member of the Spanish Society of Gynecologic Echography and Prenatal Diagnosis and of other International and European Scientific Societies. He is member of Eurogin and of the International Papillomavirus Society (IPVS). The last ten years were dedicated to promote the anti-HPV vaccination for adolescents.

In June 2015, he was appointed as an Honorary Member of the Brazilian Federation of Gynecology and Obstetrics and in July 2015 of the title of Knight of Academic Palms (conferred by the French Prime Minister Manuel Valls), then in November 2015 the Principality of Monaco wanted to give him the title of Knight of the “Order of St. Charles”. In April 2017 he has been appointed Honorary Member of the College of Obstetrics and Gynecology of Latvia. Since October 2015 he is the “Consultant dans le domaine de la politique de santé pour le Gouvernement Princier” at the Department des affaires sociales et de la santé.

In July 2022, Borruto promoted "officier dans l'ordre des palmes académiques".

Bibliography
Borruto, Franco; Ridder, Marc De. HPV and Cervical Cancer: Achievements in Prevention and Future Prospects. Springer Science & Business Media. .
Comparetto, Ciro; Borruto, Franco. Breast Surgery: Indications and Techniques. Nova Science Publishers, Incorporated. .
Comparetto, Ciro; Epifani, Anna Cristina; Borruto, Franco (April 5, 2017). Adherence to Cervical Cancer Screening in the Migrant Population. KS Omniscriptum Publishing. .
Borruto, Franco. Fetal Ultrasonography. John Wiley and Sons. February 3, 1982.

Selected publications
To prevent and to cure Papillomavirus. Sperling & Kupfer, January 2009. Authors: Franco Borruto and Joseph Monsonego.
Human Papillomavirus infection: overview. In: Handbook on Human Papillomavirus: Prevalence, detection and management. Smith HB, Ed. Nova Science Publishers, New York, July 2013: 1-137. Authors: Franco Borruto and Ciro Comparetto.
Historical overview on cervical cancer. Authors: Franco Borruto and Ciro Comparetto. In: Cervical Cancer: Screening Methods, Risk Factors and Treatment Options. Elit L, Ed. Nova Science Publishers, New York, 2013: 245-324.
Viral infections in Obstetrics and Gynecology. Authors: Franco Borruto and Ciro Comparetto. In: Viral Infections: Causes, Treatment Options and Potential Complications. Shinn D, Ed. Nova Science Publishers, New York, 2014: 1-198.
Cervical cancer screening: A never-ending developing program. World J Clin Cases 3(7):614-624, July 2015. Authors: Franco Borruto and Ciro Comparetto.
Uptake of cervical cancer screening among the migrant population of Prato Province, Italy. Comparetto C, Epifani AC, Manca MC, Lachheb A, Bravi S, Cipriani F, Bellomo F, Olivieri S, Fiaschi C, Di Marco L, Nardi V, Spinelli GS, Borruto F. Int J Gynecol Obstet, 2017; 136: 309-314. doi:10.1002/ijgo.12067.
The State-of-the-Art Therapeutic Human Papillomavirus Vaccine. Comparetto C, Borruto F. In: Horizons in Cancer Research, Volume 67. Watanabe HS, Ed. Nova Science Publishers, New York, 2017: 97-206.

References 

Living people
Italian gynaecologists
Year of birth missing (living people)